Jacques Gauthé (12 June 1939, Gaujac -  10 June 2007, Gaujac ) was a French jazz reedist.

Gauthé studied under Claude Luter and Sidney Bechet as a teenager, and formed his own band in 1957, which played with Don Byas, Mezz Mezzrow, Albert Nicholas, Lucky Thompson, and Benny Waters. In the 1960s he formed a new ensemble, the Old Time Jazz Band, which included Enzo Mucci and Claude Tissendier as sidemen. In 1972, he relocated to New Orleans, where he played at Preservation Hall and worked with Alvin Alcorn, Wallace Davenport, Freddie Kohlman, Freddy Lonzo, Louis Nelson, Steve Pistorius, and Teddy Riley.

References
Michel Laplace, "Jacques Gauthé". The New Grove Dictionary of Jazz. 2nd edition, ed. Barry Kernfeld.

French jazz saxophonists
Male saxophonists
French jazz clarinetists
French emigrants to the United States
French male jazz musicians
1939 births
2007 deaths
Stomp Off artists
20th-century French male musicians
20th-century saxophonists